Daria de Pretis (born 31 October 1956) is an Italian jurist,  Constitutional Judge of the Constitutional Court of Italy since 11 November 2014 and a Law Professor. Previously she served as Rector of the University of Trento. She studied Law at the University of Bologna and at the Free University of Berlin.

Career
Daria de Pretis was a Professor of Administrative, Comparative and Public law at the University of Trento, where she also served as Rector before being appointed to the Constitutional Court by the Italian President, Giorgio Napolitano, on 18 October 2014. At the university she also taught courses in EU Law and Law and Gender and was employed by the university for over twenty years. She was sworn in on 11 November 2014.

De Pretis has also served as head of the Italian Section of the International Institute of Administrative Sciences.

References

|-

1956 births
Living people
People from Cles
University of Bologna alumni
Academic staff of the University of Trento
Heads of universities in Italy
Judges of the Constitutional Court of Italy